Thornbury was a county constituency centred on the town of Thornbury in Gloucestershire.  It returned one Member of Parliament (MP)  to the House of Commons of the Parliament of the United Kingdom, elected by the first past the post voting system.

History
The constituency was created by the Redistribution of Seats Act 1885 for the 1885 general election, and abolished for the 1950 general election.

Boundaries
1885–1918: The Sessional Divisions of Chipping Sodbury, Thornbury, and Lawford's Gate except the part included in the parliamentary borough of Bristol.

1918–1950: The Urban District of Kingswood, and the Rural Districts of Sodbury, Thornbury, and Warmley.

Members of Parliament

Elections

Elections in the 1880s

Elections in the 1890s

Elections in the 1900s

Elections in the 1910s

General Election 1914–15:

Another General Election was required to take place before the end of 1915. The political parties had been making preparations for an election to take place and by July 1914, the following candidates had been selected; 
Liberal: Athelstan Rendall
Unionist: George Cockerill

Elections in the 1920s

Elections in the 1930s 

General Election 1939–40:
Another General Election was required to take place before the end of 1940. The political parties had been making preparations for an election to take place and by the Autumn of 1939, the following candidates had been selected; 
Conservative: Derrick Gunston
Labour:  Joseph Alpass
Liberal: Raymond Walton

Elections in the 1940s

References

Parliamentary constituencies in South West England (historic)
Constituencies of the Parliament of the United Kingdom established in 1885
Constituencies of the Parliament of the United Kingdom disestablished in 1950
Politics of Gloucestershire
Thornbury, Gloucestershire